The Tricycle Foundation is a not-for-profit educational organization based in New York City with a stated mission of introducing and disseminating Buddhist views and values in the West. Formerly called The Buddhist Ray, Inc., the foundation was established in 1990. In 1991 it launched Tricycle: The Buddhist Review.

External links
http://tricycle.org
http://tricycle.org/about/
http://www.newyork.bbb.org/reports/charityreports.aspx?pid=287&action=details&id=1339

Buddhist organizations based in the United States